Feelin' Good is the second solo album from former Temptations member David Ruffin. Released only six month after his solo debut My Whole World Ended (the #1 R&B hit), this album climbed to #9 on the R&B Charts. The album was arranged by David Van De Pitte, Henry Cosby, Paul Riser, Wade Marcus and Willie Shorter.

Track listing

Side One
"Loving You (Is Hurting Me)" (Jeana Jackson, Leonard Caston)
"Put a Little Love in Your Heart" (Jackie DeShannon, Jimmy Holiday, Randy Myers)
"I'm So Glad I Fell for You" (Art Posey, Glenna Session)
"Feeling Alright" (Dave Mason)
"I Could Never Be President" (Bettye Crutcher, Homer Banks, Raymond Jackson)
"I Pray Everyday You Won't Regret Loving Me" (Bubba Knight, Gladys Knight, Johnny Bristol)

Side Two
"What You Gave Me" (Nickolas Ashford, Valerie Simpson)
"One More Hurt" (Albert Hamilton, Norma Toney, William Garrett)
"I Let Love Slip Away" (Allen Story, Anna Gordy Gaye, Horgay Gordy)
"I Don't Know Why I Love You" (Clay McMurray)
"The Forgotten Man" (Henry Cosby, Joe Hinton, Pam Sawyer)
"The Letter" (Al Cleveland, William Robinson, Terry Johnson)

Chart history

References

1969 albums
Motown albums
Albums arranged by Wade Marcus
Albums arranged by Paul Riser
David Ruffin albums
Albums produced by Terry "Buzzy" Johnson
Albums produced by Henry Cosby
Albums produced by Berry Gordy
Albums produced by Johnny Bristol
Albums produced by Ashford & Simpson
Albums recorded at Hitsville U.S.A.